Austin "Audi" Jepson (born August 23, 1994) is an American professional soccer player who currently plays for USL League One side Forward Madison.

Career

College & Youth career
Jepson played college soccer at the University of Wisconsin–Green Bay from 2013 to 2017, including spending 2016 as a redshirt.

Jepson also played three seasons in the Premier Development League, with St. Louis Lions in 2015, for Seacoast United Phantoms in 2017, and Des Moines Menace in 2018.

Professional
Jepson signed his first professional contract with United Soccer League side Saint Louis FC on August 9, 2018.

On April 28, 2021, Jepson signed with USL League One side Forward Madison.

References

1994 births
Living people
American soccer players
Green Bay Phoenix men's soccer players
St. Louis Lions players
Seacoast United Phantoms players
Des Moines Menace players
Saint Louis FC players
Forward Madison FC players
Association football midfielders
Soccer players from Wisconsin
Sportspeople from Green Bay, Wisconsin
USL League Two players
USL Championship players